The 1997–98 NBA season was the Clippers' 28th season in the National Basketball Association, and their 4th season in Anaheim. During the off-season, the Clippers signed free agent James Robinson, and acquired Stojko Vrankovic from the Minnesota Timberwolves. With Loy Vaught going down early into the season with a back injury after only playing just ten games, averaging just 7.5 points and 6.5 rebounds per game, the Clippers struggled losing 14 of their first 16 games. After holding a 5–24 start, the team managed to win four of their next five games, but then lost 12 of their next 13 games afterwards, and held an 11–37 record at the All-Star break. At midseason, the team traded Brent Barry to the Miami Heat in exchange for last year's Most Improved Player Isaac Austin. The Clippers lost 15 of their final 17 games, including a 10-game losing streak between March and April, finishing last place in the Pacific Division with a 17–65 record.

Lamond Murray showed improvement becoming the team's starting small forward, averaging 15.4 points, 6.1 rebounds and 1.5 steals per game, and finishing tied in eighth place in Most Improved Player voting, while Rodney Rogers averaged 15.1 points and 5.6 rebounds per game, and top draft pick Maurice Taylor averaged 11.5 points and 4.2 rebounds per game off the bench, and was selected to the NBA All-Rookie Second Team. In addition, three-point specialist Eric Piatkowski contributed 11.3 points per game, while Darrick Martin provided the team with 10.3 points and 4.0 assists per game, and second-year center Lorenzen Wright provided with 9.0 points, 8.8 rebounds and 1.3 blocks per game.

Following the season, Austin signed as a free agent with the Orlando Magic, while Vaught signed with the Detroit Pistons after eight seasons with the Clippers, and head coach Bill Fitch was fired. Fitch's most losses record in NBA history with 1,106 losses stood for five years, until Lenny Wilkens broke his mark during the 2002–03 season while coaching for the Toronto Raptors.

Draft picks

Roster

Roster Notes
 Rookie center Keith Closs played for the Lakers during the pre-season and had a strong performance. When he was released, the Clippers quickly signed him to their roster.

Regular season

Season standings

z - clinched division title
y - clinched division title
x - clinched playoff spot

Record vs. opponents

Game log

Player statistics

Player Statistics Citation:

Awards and records

Transactions
The Clippers have been involved in the following transactions during the 1997-98 season.

Trades

Free agents

Additions

Subtractions

Player Transactions Citation:

See also
 1997-98 NBA season

References

Los Angeles Clippers seasons